Airport High School in West Columbia, South Carolina, United States, is a public high school offering education for grades 9 – 12, serving the communities of West Columbia, Cayce, South Congaree, Pine Ridge, and parts of Gaston. A part of Lexington County School District 2, it derives its name from its location next to (CAE) Columbia Metropolitan Airport. Sports teams are known as the Eagles. The main athletic rival is the Brookland-Cayce High School Bearcats.

Structure
Airport HS has a student body of around 1,400. Airport HS has a student: teacher ratio of 31:1 in core subjects.  The current principal is Matt Schilit, alongside assistant principals Julie Miller, Cheryl Talton, and Chris Pumphrey .

Class breakdown is as follows:

9th –  566
10th – 484
11th – 441
12th – 454

Feeder schools
Elementary and middle schools that feed into Airport High School are Congaree Elementary School, Springdale Elementary School, Herbert A. Wood Elementary School, R.H. Fulmer Middle School, and Pine Ridge Middle School.

JROTC Drill Team

Airport's Golden Talon Drill Team is a drill team that consistently finishes as the top drill team in South Carolina, and in the top 10 drill teams in the nation.

Notable alumni
Larry Francis Lebby – Artist who has served on the board of the South Carolina Nation Diabetic Association, the South Carolina Arts Commission, and the Governor's Task Force for the Arts. His work has been displayed throughout the United States in places such as the White House, the Smithsonian Institution, the United Nations and the United States Senate. In 1989, his work was displayed at the Vatican in Rome.
Duce Staley – Former NFL player and current assistant head coach for the Detroit Lions
Jim Stuckey – former NFL football player and a member of the Super Bowl XVI and XIX Champion San Francisco 49ers.

References

External links
Airport High School's Home Page
Public Schools Report Website
List of Schools Attending Drill Team Nationals
Coverage on placing at Nationals

Public high schools in South Carolina
Schools in Lexington County, South Carolina